Gandhinagar Assembly constituency may refer to 
 Gandhinagar, Jammu and Kashmir Assembly constituency
 Gandhinagar North Assembly constituency in Gujarat
 Gandhinagar South Assembly constituency
 Gandhinagar, Rajasthan Assembly constituency defunct